Nova Kovalivka is a village located in Odesa Raion, Odesa Oblast, Ukraine. It belongs to Usatove rural hromada, one of the hromadas of Ukraine, and is one of 15 villages in the hromada. It has a population of 209. 

Until 18 July 2020, Nova Kovalivka belonged to Biliaivka Raion. The raion was abolished in July 2020 as part of the administrative reform of Ukraine, which reduced the number of raions of Odesa Oblast to seven. The area of Biliaivka Raion was merged into Odesa Raion.

Population census
As of January 12 1989, Nova Kovalivka had a population of about 363; 172 men and 191 women.

As of December 5 2001, Nova Kovalivka had a population of 286.

Language distribution 
Nova Kovalivka had a few native tongue languages.

See also 
 Usatove
 Kovalivka

References

Villages in Odesa Raion
Usatove Hromada